Britney Marianne Jolina Dolonius (born June 21, 1992) is a Filipina actress and model.

Career 
Dolonius became famous for her role as Annicka in the teledrama Villa Quintana, a role where she would eventually gain her current screen name. Her biggest break came when she landed the role of Molly in The Borrowed Wife.

The stars of Jennylyn Mercado, Camille Prats, Raymart Santiago, and Rafael Rosell in the daily GMA-7s primetime block soap Second Chances so much deserved your love with the audience with his secretly break.

Filmography

Television

References

External links 
 

1992 births
Living people
21st-century Filipino actresses
Filipino television actresses
Filipino female dancers